Otaybah (sometimes spelled Ataybah, Uteibah, Ateibeh, al-Utayba, al-Otaiba or al-Atebeh) is a village in eastern Ghouta, Syria,  east of Damascus city center. The village is administratively a part of the Douma District in the Rif Dimashq Governorate. According to the Syria Central Bureau of Statistics (CBS), Otaybah had a population of 10,548 people in the 2004 census.

References

Populated places in Douma District
Cities in Syria